Avalon is a federal electoral district on Newfoundland Island in Newfoundland and Labrador, Canada. It has been represented in the House of Commons of Canada since 2004.

Demographics
According to the Canada 2011 Census; 2013 representation

Ethnic groups: 97.9% White, 1.5% Aboriginal
Languages: 99.3% English
Religions: 95.7% Christian (43.0% Catholic, 30.2% Anglican, 13.5% United Church, 3.5% Pentecostal, 5.4% Other), 4.1% No religion
Median income (2010): $27,528
Average income (2010): $36,436

Geography

The neighbouring ridings are Random—Burin—St. George's to the west and north, and St. John's South—Mount Pearl and St. John's East to the east.

As of the 2013 Representation Order, the riding of Avalon consists of:
All that area consisting of that part of the Avalon Peninsula on the Island of Newfoundland lying southerly of a line described as follows:
commencing at a point in the Eastern Channel at latitude 47°25'49"N and longitude 54°03'34"W;
thence easterly in a straight line to a point in the Eastern Channel at latitude 47°26'11"N and longitude 53°57'51"W;
thence southeasterly in a straight line to a point in Long Harbour at latitude 47°24'13"N and longitude 53°55'10"W;
thence easterly in a straight line to the southwesterly limit of the Town of Long Harbour-Mount Arlington Heights at the mouth of Rattling Brook;
thence generally westerly, generally northeasterly, generally southeasterly and generally southwesterly along the westerly, southerly, northerly and easterly limits of said town to a point at approximate latitude 47°26'32"N and longitude 53°44'50"W (on the southwesterly shoreline of Warrens Pond);
thence southeasterly in a straight line to a point at latitude 47°24'44"N and longitude 53°43'54"W;
thence easterly in a straight line to the southwesternmost point of the limit of the Town of Whitbourne; 
thence generally easterly and northerly along said limit to the northeasternmost point of the limit of said town;
thence northeasterly in a straight line to the southwesternmost point of the limit of the Town of Spaniard's Bay;
thence generally northerly along the westerly limit of said town to the northwesternmost point of the limit of said town;
thence northerly in a straight line to a point in Hound Pond at latitude 47°46'36"N and longitude 53°22'23"W;
thence northeasterly in a straight line to a point in Broad Cove Gull Pond at latitude 47°49'47"N and longitude 53°12'51"W;
thence southerly in a straight line to a point on the westerly limit of the Town of Salmon Cove at approximate latitude 47°46'51"N and longitude 53°11'48"W;
thence generally southerly, northeasterly and northwesterly along the westerly, southerly and easterly limits of said town to a point at approximate latitude 47°47'21"N and longitude 53°08'40"W;
thence easterly in a straight line to a point in Conception Bay at latitude 47°46'33"N and longitude 52°59'22"W;
thence generally southerly along Conception Bay to a point at latitude 47°35'58"N and longitude 53°06'22"W;
thence southeasterly in a straight line to a point in Conception Bay at latitude 47°32'07"N and longitude 53°02'09"W;
thence southeasterly in a straight line to the northwesterly limit of the Town of Conception Bay South at the mouth of Long Pond Harbour;
thence northeasterly along the northwesterly limit of said town to the northwesterly limit of the Town of Paradise; 
thence northeasterly along the limit of said town to the northerly limit of said town;
thence generally southeasterly along said limit to Camrose Drive;
thence southerly along said drive to Paradise Road; thence generally southeasterly along said road to Topsail Road;
thence generally easterly along said road to the southeasterly limit of the Town of Paradise;
thence southerly and westerly along said limit to the easterly limit of the Town of Conception Bay South;
thence generally southerly and westerly along said limit to the southerly limit of the City of St. John's;
thence generally southeasterly along said limit to the northwesternmost point of the Town of Bay Bulls;
thence generally southerly along the westerly limit of said town to the northwesternmost point of the Town of Witless Bay;
thence southerly and generally easterly along the westerly and southerly limits of said town to the easterly limit of said town.
Including Iona Islands, East Green Island, North Green Island, Harbour Island, Fox Island, Great Colinet Island and all other islands adjacent to the shoreline of the above-described area.

Political geography
Avalon is divided between the Liberal north and the Conservative south. Conservative support is found along the southern coast from the community of Bay Bulls to Southern Harbour. The Conservatives also have some concentration in the north central peninsula, including winning the town of Harbour Grace. The Liberals dominate the central and northern parts of the riding. In 2008, the NDP won two polls, one was a mobile poll, and the other contained the community of Hopeall. The Greens also won a poll in Witless Bay.

History
The electoral district was created in 2003 from 57.6% of Bonavista—Trinity—Conception, 21.9% of St. John's West and 20.5% of St. John's East ridings. It consisted of:
that part of the Avalon Peninsula on the Island of Newfoundland described as follows:
commencing at a point in Placentia Bay approximately 20 km west of Cape St. Mary's;
thence generally northerly along Placentia Bay and the Eastern Channel of Placentia Bay to the intersection of the shoreline of Placentia Bay with the westerly limit of the Town of Come By Chance;
thence northerly and easterly along the westerly and northerly limits of said town to the Trans-Canada Highway (Route No. 1);
thence northerly along said highway to the northerly limit of the Town of Sunnyside;
thence easterly along said limit and its production into Trinity Bay;
thence northerly along said bay to a point midway between East Random Head on Random Island and Hant's Head on the eastern shoreline of Trinity Bay;
thence northeasterly along said bay to a point approximately 5 km north of Grates Point on the Bay de Verde Peninsula;
thence easterly approximately 20 km to a point N45°E of Baccalieu Island;
thence generally southerly along Conception Bay to a point midway between Western Bay Head on the western shoreline of Conception Bay and Cape St. Francis;
thence southerly along Conception Bay to a point approximately 2 km west of the most westerly extremity of Bell Island;
thence southerly along Conception Bay to a point approximately 2 km S45°W of the most southwesterly extremity of Kellys Island;
thence easterly along Conception Bay to the mouth of Long Pond Harbour;
thence southerly along said harbour and Conway Brook to the limit of the City of St. John's; 
thence generally southwesterly and easterly along the northwesterly and southerly limits of said city and its production to the Atlantic Ocean; 
thence generally southerly and generally westerly along the Atlantic Ocean, Trepassey Bay, St. Mary's Bay and Placentia Bay to the point of commencement.
Including Baccalieu Island, Great Colinet Island and all other islands adjacent to the shoreline of the above-described area.

The 2012 federal electoral boundaries redistribution concluded that the electoral boundaries of Avalon should be adjusted, and a modified electoral district of the same name will be contested in future elections. The redefined Avalon had its boundaries legally defined in the 2013 representation order which came into effect upon the call of the 42nd Canadian federal election, scheduled for October 2015. 21% of this riding will be moved into Bonavista—Burin—Trinity, and 3% will be moved into St. John's South—Mount Pearl, and will gain 25% of its new territory from St. John's East. It was given the boundaries described above.

Members of Parliament

This riding has elected the following Members of Parliament:

Election results

2021 general election

2019 general election

2015 general election

2011 general election

In the 2011 election, the Liberal candidate was the incumbent MP, Scott Andrews, a former municipal councillor from Conception Bay South. He defeated the Tory candidate, Senator Fabian Manning of St. Bride's, for the second election in a row. Manning was the Conservative MP for this riding from 2006 to 2008, when he lost to Andrews.

2008 general election

2006 general election

2004 general election

Student Vote results

2019

2015

2011

See also
 List of Canadian federal electoral districts
 Past Canadian electoral districts

References

Notes

External links
 Avalon riding from Elections Canada
 Riding history for Avalon (2003– ) from the Library of Parliament
 Election Financial Reports from Elections Canada
 Avalon District Profile from Statistics Canada
 Census subdivisions of Newfoundland and Labrador from Statistics Canada

Newfoundland and Labrador federal electoral districts
Conception Bay South
2003 establishments in Newfoundland and Labrador